The Second Bouffier cabinet was the state government of Hesse between 2014 and 2019, sworn in on 18 January 2014 after Volker Bouffier was elected as Minister-President of Hesse by the members of the Landtag of Hesse. It was the 21st Cabinet of Hesse.

It was formed after the 2013 Hessian state election by the Christian Democratic Union (CDU) and Alliance 90/The Greens (GRÜNE). Excluding the Minister-President, the cabinet comprised ten ministers. Eight were members of the CDU and two were members of the Greens.

The second Bouffier cabinet was succeeded by the third Bouffier cabinet on 18 January 2019.

Formation 

The previous cabinet was a coalition government of the CDU and Free Democratic Party (FDP) led by Minister-President Volker Bouffier of the CDU.

The election took place on 22 September 2013, and resulted in major losses for the FDP and a slight improvement for the CDU. The opposition SPD achieved significant gains, while the Greens declined and The Left remained steady.

Overall, the incumbent coalition lost its majority. The opposition coalition of the SPD and Greens also fell short of a majority, leaving no clear path to government for either major party. Options included a grand coalition of the CDU and SPD, an SPD–Green–Left coalition, and a CDU–Green coalition. A traffic light coalition of the SPD, Greens, and FDP also held a majority, but was ruled out by the FDP. The SPD and Greens both announced plans to hold exploratory talks with all other parties and stated they were open to all options. The Left stated they would be willing to provide external support to a minority government of the SPD and Greens.

The first round of talks between the CDU and SPD were inconclusive. After meeting on 8 October, the CDU and Greens spoke positively and scheduled a second round for the following week. On the 15th, Bouffier and Green leader Tarek Al-Wazir stated that, despite differences, a coalition between their parties could be possible. They organised a third meeting for two weeks later. Meanwhile, opinion polling indicated that two-thirds of voters preferred a coalition between the CDU and SPD.

At the same time, the SPD and Greens held joint talks with The Left. Though they found common ground on education, energy, and labour, they encountered difficulties over finance policy and proposed expansions to Frankfurt Airport. They were also troubled by public spats between party leaders, with Janine Wissler accusing the SPD of sabotaging a potential coalition after the 2008 Hessian state election and federal SPD chairman Sigmar Gabriel describing The Left as "crazies". The Greens and later SPD rejected The Left's proposal for a minority government, leaving a formal coalition as the only option.

By mid-November, the CDU and Greens continued to give optimistic signs, while talks had stalled between the three left-wing parties; SPD leader Thorsten Schäfer-Gümbel was rumoured to have declared negotiations with The Left a failure. Exploratory discussions also continued between the SPD and CDU, finding common ground in areas like finance policy, although both parties described a grand coalition as a last resort. Talks concluded indecisively on the 18th.

On 22 November, Volker Bouffier announced that the CDU intended to offer coalition negotiations to the Greens. The next day, the Greens congress voted to accept. The CDU and Greens presented their coalition contract on 18 December. It was approved by both parties' congresses on the 21st, with the Greens voting 74% in support and the CDU near-unanimously, and officially signed on 23 December.

Bouffier was elected Minister-President by the Landtag on 18 January 2014, though the initial ballot was invalidated because of an administrative error: the generic placeholder name Max Mustermann was printed on some of the ballots instead of Volker Bouffier's name, causing the vote to be re-taken. In the re-vote, Bouffier was elected with 62 votes out of 109 cast.

Composition 
The composition of the cabinet at the time of its dissolution was as follows:

References 

Government of Hesse
State governments of Germany
Cabinets established in 2014
2014 establishments in Germany
2019 disestablishments in Germany
Cabinets disestablished in 2019